T8AA may refer to:

 T8AA (AM), a radio station (1584 kHz) licensed to Koror, Palau
 T8AA-FM, a radio station (87.9 MHz) licensed to Koror, Palau

Broadcast call sign disambiguation pages